Býšť is a municipality and village in Pardubice District in the Pardubice Region of the Czech Republic. It has about 1,600 inhabitants.

Administrative parts
Villages of Bělečko, Hoděšovice and Hrachoviště are administrative parts of Býšť.

Geography
It lies on the border between the East Elbe Table and Orlice Table.

History
The first written mention of Býšť is from 1360, when the church was mentioned. Býšť was devastated during the Thirty Years' War. The first school here was built in 1780. During the 19th century, there was also a synagogue.

During the 18th century Býšť, together with Rokytno and Chvojenec, was the centre of a persecuted religious sect of Deists called blouznivci.

Transport
Býšť is located on the road from Hradec Králové to Brno.

Sights
The landmark of Býšť is the Church of Saint George. The current Baroque building dates from 1822, when it was reconstructed after a fire.

Notable people
Eduard Nápravník (1839–1916), conductor and composer

References

External links

Villages in Pardubice District